"Never Comes the Day" is a 1969 single by the progressive rock band the Moody Blues.  It was written by band member Justin Hayward, and was the only single released from their 1969 album On the Threshold of a Dream.

Background
The song was edited from the album version of 4:43 down to 2:42.  The single edit omits the second verse and simply goes into the longer chorus after the first verse.  A similar edit was done on the Justin Hayward/John Lodge (Blue Jays) song "I Dreamed Last Night", but that version ends cold.  Despite the fact that the album was a number-one hit in the UK, "Never Comes the Day" was a commercial flop as a single, and did not chart in the UK.  The single also included Mike Pinder's "So Deep Within You,"  another track from the same album, on the B-side.

Reception
Cash Box described it as "starting in a gentle folk vein" with less impact than expected, but then grows to become an "hypnotic outing."

Personnel
 Justin Hayward – acoustic & electric guitars, lead vocals, Mellotron, handclapping
 John Lodge – bass guitar, backing vocals, handclapping
 Mike Pinder – Mellotron, backing vocals, handclapping
 Ray Thomas – harmonica, backing vocals, handclapping
 Graeme Edge – drums, percussion, backing vocals, handclapping

Chart positions

References

The Moody Blues songs
1969 singles
Songs written by Justin Hayward
1969 songs
Deram Records singles